Sally Peake (born 8 February 1986) is a British track and field athlete who specialises in the pole vault. She was the silver medallist in the pole vault at the 2014 Commonwealth Games.

Peake is a two-time British champion (2013 and 2014). She has represented Great Britain at the 2011 Summer Universiade and the 2012 European Athletics Championships, as well as having competed for Wales at the 2010 Commonwealth Games.

In addition to her pole vaulting career, she is a physiotherapist for the Football Association of Wales.

Career
Born in Chester, Peake initially competed in gymnastics but gave up the sport in favour of track and field as she grew older. She joined Liverpool Harriers and focused on triple jump and long jump during her early years at the club. She struggled to progress in the events and took up pole vaulting at the end of 2008. In 2007, she graduated from Cardiff University with a first-class honours science degree and continued to specialise in physiotherapy.

In 2011, she moved to Loughborough to be closer to her coach Scott Simpson. She narrowly missed the podium with a fourth-place finish at the British Athletics Championships. She retained her Welsh title and was runner-up at the British Olympic trials (behind Holly Bleasdale), but did not achieve the qualifying "A" standard, which was set at four and a half metres. Her senior debut at the 2012 European Athletics Championships followed and she competed in the qualifying only.

She also competed at her first IAAF Diamond League event, vaulting at the London Anniversary Games and placing eighth. She did not compete internationally that year. She placed third at the 2014 British Indoor Championships before going on to win the British outdoor title for a second year running. She was beaten by Northern Ireland's Zoe Brown at the Welsh Open Championships, but was still selected for Wales at the 2014 Commonwealth Games. At the Commonwealth Games in Glasgow she won her first international medal, clearing  in very wet conditions to take the silver medal for Wales.

Personal bests
Pole vault –  (2014)
Pole vault indoor –  (2012)
Long jump –  (2008)
Triple jump –  (2008)
Triple jump indoor –  (2008)

International competition record

References

External links

1986 births
Living people
Sportspeople from Chester
British female pole vaulters
Welsh pole vaulters
Welsh female athletes
Commonwealth Games silver medallists for Wales
Commonwealth Games medallists in athletics
Athletes (track and field) at the 2010 Commonwealth Games
Athletes (track and field) at the 2014 Commonwealth Games
Athletes (track and field) at the 2018 Commonwealth Games
British Athletics Championships winners
Competitors at the 2011 Summer Universiade
Alumni of Cardiff University
Medallists at the 2014 Commonwealth Games